Dmitri Grigoryevich Turutin (born 10 April 1981) is a former Russian professional football player.

Club career
He played in the Russian Football National League for FC Baltika Kaliningrad in 2000.

References

External links
 

1981 births
Sportspeople from Kaliningrad
Living people
Russian footballers
Association football midfielders
FC Baltika Kaliningrad players
FC Sibir Novosibirsk players
FC Dynamo Barnaul players
FC Sakhalin Yuzhno-Sakhalinsk players